George Harper (born 10 July 1992 in Basingstoke) is an English racing cyclist, who last rode for .

Major results
2015
1st Severn Bridge Road Race
1st Tour series Hill climb
5th Tour series - Aberystwyth
4th Tour of Reservoir - Stage 1
2016
6th Overall Tour de Langkawi

References

1992 births
Living people
English male cyclists
Sportspeople from Basingstoke